Ice House Street is a one-way street in Central, Hong Kong Island, Hong Kong. Named after the structure previously located on it that housed the city's only source of ice, it stretches from Lower Albert Road to Connaught Road. The street is noted for several historical landmarks situated on it, most notably the Club Lusitano and the Old Dairy Farm Depot.

History
During the First Opium War, the British occupied Hong Kong in 1841 and one year later, the territory was ceded to them in the Treaty of Nanking. Four years later, in 1845, the Hong Kong Ice Company was founded. It was set up with the intention of selling ice blocks from the United States—specifically from New England and New York State. These were transported to the colony on clippers and traded as a commodity. To persuade the company to sell ice to local hospitals at cost price, the Government of Hong Kong granted the company the site for an ice house rent-free for 75 years. The building eventually lent its name to the street it was situated on; it was Hong Kong's only source of ice, because that there were no "commercial ice-making facilities" in the colony. The house was on the intersection of Ice House Street and Queen's Road Central, and continued to store ice imports until 1874, when ice production started in Causeway Bay.

Description and features

From its southern end, Ice House Street begins at its junction with Lower Albert Road. This is where the Old Dairy Farm Depot is located. Built by Dairy Farm, one of the first companies that sold ice cream and refrigerated milk in the city, it currently houses the Hong Kong Fringe Club and the Foreign Correspondents' Club. Although not officially on the street itself, the Bishop's House is situated across from the depot and overlooks it from an elevated vantage point. It serves as the residence of the Archbishop of Hong Kong (Anglican). The next landmark on the route is the flight of stairs that descend onto Duddell Street and contain four gas lamps from the 1870s that are declared monuments. Before the street intersects with Queen's Road Central, it passes the Club Lusitano. The club, which is the meeting point for Portuguese expatriates in the city, has been located on the site since 1920 when it moved down from its original 1866 site in Shelly Street. The building has since been reconstructed twice, in 1967 and 1996-2002

After crossing with Queen's Road, Ice House Street goes past 9 Queen's Road Central. Although the current skyscraper is located in the same place as a former building that stood on the site until 1987, the old complex's address was 9 Ice House Street. The street then intersects with Des Voeux Road Central and Chater Road before ending on Connaught Road Central.

Other features
Other buildings located along the street include:
Former Central Government Offices West Wing – 11 Ice House Street
Alexandra House and Prince's Building, between Des Voeux Road Central and Chater Road
Mandarin Oriental, between Chater Road and Connaught Road Central

Major intersections

See also
 List of streets and roads in Hong Kong

References

External links

Ice House Street and map – Lonely Planet

Central, Hong Kong
Roads on Hong Kong Island
 Odonyms referring to a building